The First Mas Government was the regional government of Catalonia led by President Artur Mas between 2010 and 2012. It was formed in December 2010 following the regional election and ended in December 2012 following the regional election.

Executive Council

Notes

References
 Ministries. Government of Catalonia.

2010 establishments in Catalonia
2012 disestablishments in Catalonia
Cabinets established in 2010
Cabinets disestablished in 2012
Cabinets of Catalonia